George Byng may refer to:

George Byng (c. 1556–1616), MP for Rochester
George Byng, 1st Viscount Torrington (1663–1733), Royal Navy officer and statesman
George Byng, 3rd Viscount Torrington (1701–1750), British Army officer and peer
George Byng (1735–1789), British Member of Parliament 
George Byng (1764–1847), British Member of Parliament, son of the above
George Byng, 4th Viscount Torrington (1740–1812), English peer
George Byng, 6th Viscount Torrington (1768–1831), Royal Navy officer
George Byng, 2nd Earl of Strafford (1806–1886), British peer and politician
George Byng, 7th Viscount Torrington (1812–1884), British colonial administrator and courtier
George Byng, 3rd Earl of Strafford (1830–1898), British politician
George Byng, 8th Viscount Torrington (1841–1889), British politician
George Byng, 9th Viscount Torrington (1886–1944)
George W. Byng (1861–1932), composer and conductor